Psilocybe thaiaerugineomaculans is a species of psilocybin mushroom in the family Hymenogastraceae. Found in Chiang Mai University Park (Chiang Mai Province, Thailand), where it grows on cow dung, it was described as new to science in 2012. The specific epithet thaiaerugineomaculans refers to its similarity to Psilocybe aerugineomaculans, and to Thailand.

See also
''List of Psilocybe species
List of Psilocybin mushrooms

References

External links

Entheogens
Fungi described in 2012
Fungi of Asia
Psychoactive fungi
thaiaerugineomaculans
Psychedelic tryptamine carriers
Taxa named by Gastón Guzmán